Markus Büchel (born August 9 1949 in Rütli) is a Swiss Roman Catholic bishop of Roman Catholic Diocese of Saint Gallen.

Life 
Büchel studied philosophy and Roman Catholic theology at University of Fribourg. He was ordained priest in St. Gallen. On 17 September 2006	Büchel was ordained bishop of Roman Catholic Diocese of Saint Gallen.

References

External links 
 Bistum Sankt Gallen: Markus Büchel (german)
 
 Markus Büchel, Bischof von St. Gallen at website by Bistum St. Gallen
 Sankt Galler Tagblatt.ch: Etlernwerdung befasst sich mit Kindern (german)
 Sankt Galler Tagblatt.ch: Irregeleitete Rücksicht auf den Ruf der Kirche (german)

21st-century Roman Catholic bishops in Switzerland
1949 births
Living people
University of Fribourg alumni
People from the canton of Uri